This is a list of Catholic churches in Australia.

Cathedrals
See: List of cathedrals in Australia#Roman Catholic
Cathedral of St Stephen, Brisbane
Holy Name Cathedral, Brisbane
Sacred Heart Cathedral, Bendigo
St Francis Xavier's Cathedral, Adelaide
St Francis Xavier's Cathedral, Wollongong
St John's Pro-Cathedral
St Mary's Cathedral, Perth
St Mary's Cathedral, Sydney
St Patrick's Cathedral, Melbourne
St Patrick's Cathedral, Parramatta

Basilicas
Our Lady of Victories Basilica, Camberwell
St Mary of the Angels Basilica, Geelong
St Patrick's Basilica, Fremantle

Other churches
St Brigid's Church, Millers Point, Sydney
St Patrick's Church, The Rocks, Sydney
Blessed Virgin Mary Queen of Peace, Scone
First St. Mary's Roman Catholic Church, Warwick
Our Lady of the Sacred Heart Church, Randwick
Our Lady of the Sacred Heart Church, Thursday Island
St Brigid's Church, Perth
St Mary Star of the Sea, West Melbourne
St Francis Catholic Church (Melbourne)
St James, Muswellbrook
St Thomas Aquinas Church (Springwood, New South Wales)
Sacred Heart Church St Kilda
Tennant Creek Catholic Church

See also
List of Roman Catholic dioceses in Australia
Roman Catholicism in Australia

 
Catholic
Australia